The 2002 Liga Indonesia Premier Division (also known as the Liga Bank Mandiri for sponsorship reasons) was the eighth season of the Liga Indonesia Premier Division, the top Indonesian professional league for association football clubs, since its formation in 1994. It began on 13 January and ended on 7 July. Petrokimia Putra won the title after beating Persita 3–2 in the final.

Teams

Team changes

Relegated from Premier Division 

 Persijap
 Persikabo
 Persiraja
 Persma
 PSP
 Putra Samarinda

Promoted to Premier Division 

 PSIS
 Persedikab

Stadiums and locations

First stage

West Division

East Division

Second stage

Group A

Group B

Knockout stage

Semifinals

Final

Top Goalscorer and Best Player
 Ilham Jaya Kesuma (Persita Tangerang) - 26 goals, also the best player.

References

External links
Indonesia - List of final tables (RSSSF)

Top level Indonesian football league seasons
Indonesian Premier Division seasons
1
1
Indonesia
Indonesia